Señorita bread, also known as Spanish bread or pan de kastila, is a  Filipino bread roll characteristically oblong or cylindrical in shape with a traditional sweet filling made of breadcrumbs, butter or margarine, and brown sugar. It is usually yellowish in color due to the use of eggs and butter. The exterior is sprinkled with breadcrumbs. It is one of the most popular types of bread in the Philippines, commonly eaten during merienda.

Despite the name, it does not originate from Spain and has no relation to the Spanish pan de horno (also called "Spanish bread").

Description
Señorita bread is made similarly to pandesal except for the addition of eggs and butter. It is also similar to the Filipino ensaymada, except it is rolled in a different way. Its distinctive aspect is the sweet filling, which is traditionally made from butter (or margarine) mixed with breadcrumbs and brown sugar. The filling is evenly spread on the flattened dough (usually triangular in shape, but can also be square). It is then rolled into a cylinder from one corner, resulting in the characteristic horn-like shape. It is sprinkled with breadcrumbs on the outside and then baked.

See also
Pan de regla
Pan de sal
Pan de monja
Pan de coco

References 

Breads
Yeast breads
Southeast Asian breads
Philippine breads